Anthony Jackson-Hamel (born August 3, 1993) is a Canadian soccer player who most recently played as a forward for the Montreal Impact in Major League Soccer.

Professional

Club

Montreal Impact
Jackson-Hamel began playing in 2010 with the Montreal Impact Academy in the Canadian Soccer League. In 2014 he played with the USL PDL club Montreal Impact U23, where he netted 4 goals in 6 appearances.

He signed his first professional contract with the Montreal Impact on August 1, 2014. He made his debut as a 65th-minute substitute during a 0–2 loss to Toronto FC on August 2, 2014. He started his first MLS game on the 13th of September 2014 against New England Revolution. Jackson-Hamel was selected to participate at the 2015 Chipotle Homegrown Game against Club América U-20 as part of the 2015 MLS All-Star Game festivities. He scored his first goal for the Impact against the New York Red Bulls in a 3–0 victory on March 13, 2016.

In April 2017, there was speculation that Jackson-Hamel would be released by the Impact. Amongst this speculation, Jackson-Hamel scored 3 goals in 37 minutes to start the 2017 season, including a backheel in stoppage time to defeat Atlanta United, and 2 goals against Philadelphia Union. After a difficult 2018 season, where Jackson-Hamel only managed two goals and was dropped mid-season by Montreal coach Rémi Garde, the coach confirmed the club were actively shopping the striker. At the end of the 2020 season, Jackson-Hamel would be released by the Impact, ending his time at the club after seven seasons.

International
Jackson-Hamel was born in Canada to a Dominican father and Quebecois mother. He has represented Canada at youth level and was a part of the team that played at the 2013 CONCACAF U-20 Championship.

He received his first call-up to the Canadian national team in October 2016 for a pair of friendlies in Morocco. He subsequently made his debut for Canada on October 6, 2016 against Mauritania, coming on as a substitute in the 69th minute. Jackson-Hamel scored his first goal for Canada against Bermuda on January 22, 2017.

International goals 

Scores and results list Canada's goal tally first.

Honours

Club

Montreal Impact
 Canadian Championship: 2019

Career statistics

Club

References

External links
Anthony Jackson-Hamel Fútbol en Fútbol Dominicano. Net

Du gazon de Limoilou à la MLS 
À l'extérieur de la glace… avec Anthony Jackson-Hamel 

1993 births
Living people
Sportspeople from Quebec City
Black Canadian soccer players
Canadian people of Dominican Republic descent
Sportspeople of Dominican Republic descent
Canadian people of French descent
French Quebecers
Canadian soccer players
Soccer people from Quebec
Association football forwards
Canadian Soccer League (1998–present) players
Montreal Impact U23 players
CF Montréal players
FC Montreal players
USL League Two players
Major League Soccer players
USL Championship players
Canada men's youth international soccer players
Canada men's under-23 international soccer players
Canada men's international soccer players
2017 CONCACAF Gold Cup players
Homegrown Players (MLS)